The 2004–05 Serie B is the 73rd season since its establishment in 1929. It is the second highest football league in Italy.

Teams
Arezzo, Catanzaro, Cesena and Crotone had been promoted from Serie C, while Perugia, Modena, and Empoli had been relegated from Serie A, and Ancona had lost their national professional licence.

Events
Following the long-standing consequences of the “Caso Catania”, the league included 22 teams, while promotions decreased to three spots.

Promotion playoffs were also introduced.

Final classification

Results

Play-off

Promotion play-off
(later became a relegation play-off)
Semi-finals

Finals

Torino Calcio promoted to Serie A, but later it went bankrupt and it was restored in 2005–06 Serie B by the Lodo Petrucci. Perugia Calcio also went bankrupt and it was restored in 2005–06 Serie C1 by the Lodo Petrucci.

This promotion play-off consequently became a relegation play-off.

Relegation play-off
(later annulled)

Vicenza Calcio was lucky because its relegation was annulled following the Caso Genoa.

Serie B seasons
2004–05 in Italian football leagues
Italy